National Congress Party may refer to:

 National Congress Party (Sudan), the dominant political party of Sudan
 National Congress Party (Morocco)
 Indian National Congress, a major political party in India
 Nationalist Congress Party of India, based in the state of Maharashtra

See also
 National Congress (disambiguation)